For main Top 5 Division, see: 2014 Asian Five Nations

The 2014 Asian Five Nations division tournaments, known as the 2014 HSBC Asian 5 Nations for sponsorship reasons, refer to the divisions played within the annual Asian Five Nations rugby union tournament. This is the 7th series of the Asian Five Nations. For the first time since 2010, only four division were used, with a shortened Division 1 due to the change of format in 2015. Division 3 was split into an East and a West conference which like Division 1 was out in place ahead of that format in 2015.

Changes from 2013
 The United Arab Emiratis participated in the Division 1 tournament, haven been relegated from the Top 5.
 Sri Lanka was promoted to the Top 5 Division, after winning the Division 1 competition in 2013.
 Singapore have replaced Thailand in Division 1, with Thailand competing in Division 2.
 Qatar will compete in Division 2 - replacing India, following promotion from Division 3.
 Lebanon promoted out of Division 4, though no team was demoted out of Division 3.
 With the removal of Division 5, Laos was moved to Division 3, while Brunei, Cambodia and Mongolia forms a new Division 4.

Teams
The teams involved, with their world rankings pre tournament, were:

Division 1
  (58)
  (45)
  (56)
  (97)

Division 2
  (NA)
  (71)
  (NA)
  (60)

Division 3 East
  (68)
  (88)
  (96)
  (NA)

Division 3 West
  (74)
  (NA)
  (76)
  (96)

Division 4
  (NA)
  (NA)
  (NA)

Division 1

The 2014 Division 1 tournament was held as a single match knock-out format. The participants of the final will remain in Division 1 for the 2015 as the bottom two teams from the 2014 Asian Five Nations tournament will be relegated to Division 1.

Fixtures

Division 2

The 2014 Division II tournament, like the previous tournaments, is being held in a single match knock-out format.

Semi-finals

Third place play-off

Final

Division 3
The 2014 Division 3 tournament was split into an East and West tournament with both tournaments being held in a single match knock-out format.

East

Semi-finals

Third place play-off

Final

West

Semi-finals

Third place play-off

Final

Division 4

The 2014 Division IV tournament was held as a single round-robin tournament held in Bandar Seri Begawan, Brunei.

References

External links
Official Website
ARFU

2014
2014 in Asian rugby union
Asia